Daniel McConnell (born 21 June 1986) is a former member of the West Coast Eagles Australian Football League club. He was taken at pick 26 in the 2003 AFL draft by the West Coast Eagles, a second round selection.

He was traded to the Roos at the end of the 2005 season, in exchange for pick 13 (Shannon Hurn) and 29 (Ben McKinley).

References

External links
 
 

North Melbourne Football Club players
West Coast Eagles players
Living people
1986 births
Eastern Ranges players
Australian rules footballers from Victoria (Australia)
East Perth Football Club players